C. Sankar was an Indian politician and former Member of the Legislative Assembly. He was elected to the Travancore-Cochin assembly as an Indian National Congress candidate from Nagercoil constituency in Kanyakumari district in 1952 election. This was the first election from this constituency and it happened before Kanyakumari district merged with Tamil Nadu.

References 

People from Kanyakumari district
Indian National Congress politicians from Tamil Nadu
Living people
Travancore–Cochin MLAs 1952–1954
Year of birth missing (living people)